In chemistry, a phase-transfer catalyst or PTC is a catalyst that facilitates the transition of a reactant from one phase into another phase where reaction occurs. Phase-transfer catalysis is a special form of heterogeneous catalysis. Ionic reactants are often soluble in an aqueous phase but insoluble in an organic phase in the absence of the phase-transfer catalyst. The catalyst functions like a detergent for solubilizing the salts into the organic phase. Phase-transfer catalysis refers to the acceleration of the reaction upon the addition of the phase-transfer catalyst.

By using a PTC process, one can achieve faster reactions, obtain higher conversions or yields, make fewer byproducts, eliminate the need for expensive or dangerous solvents that will dissolve all the reactants in one phase, eliminate the need for expensive raw materials and/or minimize waste problems. Phase-transfer catalysts are especially useful in green chemistry—by allowing the use of water, the need for organic solvents is reduced.

Contrary to common perception, PTC is not limited to systems with hydrophilic and hydrophobic reactants. PTC is sometimes employed in liquid/solid and liquid/gas reactions. As the name implies, one or more of the reactants are transported into a second phase which contains both reactants.

Types
Phase-transfer catalysts for anionic reactants are often quaternary ammonium salts. Commercially important catalysts include benzyltriethylammonium chloride, methyltricaprylammonium chloride and methyltributylammonium chloride. Organic phosphonium salts are also used, e.g., hexadecyltributylphosphonium bromide. The phosphonium salts tolerate higher temperatures, but are unstable toward base, degrading to phosphine oxide.

For example, the nucleophilic substitution reaction of an aqueous sodium cyanide solution with an ethereal solution of 1-bromooctane does not readily occur. The 1-bromooctane is poorly soluble in the aqueous cyanide solution, and the sodium cyanide does not dissolve well in the ether. Upon the addition of small amounts of hexadecyltributylphosphonium bromide, a rapid reaction ensues to give nonyl nitrile:
C8H17Br_{(org)}{} + NaCN_{(aq)} ->[\ce{R4P+Br-}] C8H17CN_{(org)}{} + NaBr_{(aq)}
By the quaternary phosphonium cation, cyanide ions are "ferried" from the aqueous phase into the organic phase.

Subsequent work demonstrated that many such reactions can be performed rapidly at around room temperature using catalysts such as tetra-n-butylammonium bromide and methyltrioctylammonium chloride in benzene/water systems.

An alternative to the use of "quat salts" is to convert alkali metal cations into hydrophobic cations. In the research lab, crown ethers are used for this purpose. Polyethylene glycols are more commonly used in practical applications. These ligands encapsulate alkali metal cations (typically  and ), affording large lipophilic cations. These polyethers have a hydrophilic "interiors" containing the ion and a hydrophobic exterior.

Chiral phase-transfer catalysts have also been demonstrated.

Applications
PTC is widely exploited industrially. Polyesters for example are prepared from acyl chlorides and bisphenol-A. Phosphothioate-based pesticides are generated by PTC-catalyzed alkylation of phosphothioates. One of the more complex applications of PTC involves asymmetric alkylations, which are catalyzed by chiral quaternary ammonium salts derived from cinchona alkaloids.

See also
Ionic transfer

References

Catalysts